The Thieves Banquet is the fourth album from hip hop artist Akala. It was released on 27 May 2013 by Illa State Records.

Track listing
All lyrics written by Akala

Personnel
Credits are adapted from the album's liner notes.

Anthony Dorment, Niomi Daley – Executive-Producer
Kingslee Daley – Producer (tracks: 1, 3, 4, 7, 8, 10, 11, 12)
Lavar Bullard – Producer (tracks: 1, 3, 4, 7, 8, 10, 11, 12) Co-producer (tracks: 6, 9)
Anthony Marshall – Producer (tracks: 2, 5) Co-producer (tracks: 6)
Aaron 'Pantha' Cowan – Producer (tracks: 9)
Artwork – Tokio Aoyama
Design – Rob Dobrowolsky

References

2013 albums
Akala (rapper) albums